1105 West Peachtree is a mixed-use development currently under construction in Atlanta, Georgia, United States. Located along West Peachtree Street in Midtown Atlanta, the development would consist primarily of a 32-story office building and a smaller residential tower called 40 West 12th.

History 
The project, occupying a  lot on West Peachtree Street in Midtown Atlanta, was announced by Selig Enterprises in December 2016. The project, which they announced would begin construction the following Summer, would consist of a 32-story office building featuring  of office space and a residential building housing 80 residences and a 150-room hotel. These two buildings would be connected by a raised plaza, with additional street level retail on the site. The architecture firm Rule Joy Trammell & Rubio would design the project, which had an expected cost of $400 million. In June 2017, Selig had applied for permits to demolish three preexisting buildings on the site, including the Dr. Marion Luther Brittain Sr. House, which was listed on the National Register of Historic Places. Permits were approved later that year, and by January 2018 the buildings were demolished. The next month, it was announced that the hotel for the project would be part of the Autograph Collection by Marriott International.

In December 2018, Selig announced that construction on the project would begin in January of the following year. That same month, the project signed on its first tenants, a law firm relocating from Promenade II. By April 2019, condominiums at the property were being sold, with an opening scheduled for Spring 2021. In October, Cushman & Wakefield, acting for Selig, secured $340 million from The Blackstone Group, covering much of the budget, which by this time had risen to approximately $530 million. The project held its official groundbreaking on October 28, 2019. In January 2020, Brasfield & Gorrie were announced as the project's general contractor, and that same month, the raised plaza, which will serve as a connecting deck between the two buildings, topped out.

On February 19, a tower crane at the construction site became unstable and started to lean due to a mechanical failure, causing authorities to close several nearby roadways as the crane was disassembled. Several nearby apartment buildings and parking garages were also evacuated.

References

External links 
 
 
 
 

Buildings and structures in Atlanta
Buildings and structures under construction in the United States
Midtown Atlanta
Mixed-use developments in Georgia (U.S. state)
Proposed buildings and structures in Georgia (U.S. state)